Wildflower (formerly Wild Flower) is an unincorporated community in Fresno County, California.

Wild Flower post office operated from 1878 to 1898.

References

Unincorporated communities in California
Unincorporated communities in Fresno County, California